The Midas Schoolhouse, located on Second St., two blocks east of Main St., in Midas, Nevada, was a historic schoolhouse that was built in 1928.  It is listed on the National Register of Historic Places (NRHP).

The building was destroyed by a fire in 2005.

Its NRHP nomination argued that the building is significant "for its association with the educational and social history of the remote, early-twentieth-century mining town."  It includes Craftsman architecture.  It has a cross-gabled roof that once had wood shakes, now is covered by regular composition shingles;  its exterior is horizontal wooden shiplap.  It is a small building, and has two original outhouses at the back;  the school and both of those were deemed contributing buildings in the NRHP listing.  In 2004, building was serving as a community meeting room and as a museum.

It was listed on the National Register in 2004.

References

External links
 Friends of Midas

School buildings on the National Register of Historic Places in Nevada
School buildings completed in 1928
American Craftsman architecture in Nevada
Museums in Elko County, Nevada
Defunct museums in Nevada
National Register of Historic Places in Elko County, Nevada
1928 establishments in Nevada